Packsaddle Mountain can refer to the following mountains in the United States:

Packsaddle Mountain, in the Cerbat Mountains, Mohave County, Arizona
Packsaddle Mountain (Idaho) in Bonner County
Packsaddle Mountain (Lane County, Oregon)
Packsaddle Mountain (Wheeler County, Oregon)
Packsaddle Mountain (Llano County, Texas)
Packsaddle Mountain (Brewster County, Texas)

References